Ragged Rubble is an album by post hardcore band Double Dagger.

Track listing

 "The Psychic"
 "Empty Dictionary"
 "Luxury Condos for the Poor"
 "Form+Function"
 "Stripes"
 "ITCFGDIY"
 "Army vs. Navy"
 "Pissing Contest"
 "Camera Chimera"
 "Camera Chimera (Reprise)"
 "Plagiarism"
 "Rearranging Digital Deck Chairs"

2007 albums
Double Dagger (band) albums